Ismael García Moreno (born 27 April 1975) is a Spanish wheelchair basketball player. He represented Spain at the 2012 Summer Paralympics as a member of Spain men's national team.

Personal 
García was born on 27 April 1975 in the Canary Islands.  In 2012, he lived in Madrid. In November 2013, he participated in a program run by the Programa ADOP Empleo to train Paralympic athletes in developing business communication and entrepreneurship skills.

Wheelchair basketball 
García is a power forward, and 4 point player.

National team 
García was part of the team that competed at the 2009 European Championships.  He was one of the major factors in keeping Spain competitive against Germany during the competition, finishing the game as the team's second leading scorer. His selection to represent Spain at the 2011 European Championships was made in March.

García competed in wheelchair basketball at the 2012 Summer Paralympics in London. It was the first time the Spanish national team had qualified for the Paralympics in 16 years. In London, he was coached by Oscar Trigo. His team finished fifth overall. He played in the opening game against Italy, which his team won. When Rafael Muino Gamez broke his wheel in the game against Italy, Garcia brought him a replacement wheel. In London, he made one 3 pointer. He was a member of the national team at the 2013 European Championships.  His team finished with a bronze medal after defeating Sweden.

Club 
In 2009, García played for Sandra Gran Canaria. In 2011, he played for Las Palmas de Gran Canaria BSR. In 2013, he played club wheelchair basketball in Spain for Fundación Grupo Norte.  On the way to an away game against Amiab, the team's transport broke 40 km from the game.  His team lost the game despite leading the game for the first three quarters.  He scored 9 points in the game.  He also played for BSR Ace Gran Canaria.

References

External links 

 
 

1975 births
Living people
Spanish men's basketball players
Paralympic wheelchair basketball players of Spain
Wheelchair basketball players at the 2012 Summer Paralympics
Power forwards (basketball)